Mohammad Sultan Tantray (21 January 1927 – 25 April 2005) was born in Bohipora of Kupwara district in Kashmir.  He  represented Kupwara constituency in the Jammu and Kashmir Legislative Assembly from 1957 to 1972.

References

People from Kupwara district
Jammu and Kashmir MLAs 1957–1962
1927 births
2005 deaths
Jammu and Kashmir MLAs 1962–1967
Jammu and Kashmir MLAs 1967–1972